Jesse Hirsh is a broadcaster, researcher, public speaker and Internet evangelist in Toronto, Ontario, Canada. He has appeared on CBC Radio, and has a weekly spot on CBC Newsworld where he explains and analyses trends and developments in technology. He co-hosts an interfaith show on Omni Television called 3D: Dialogue.

Personal life
Hirsh was educated at the McLuhan Program in Culture and Technology at the University of Toronto, where he also studied with sociologist Barry Wellman.

In 1995, while studying at UofT, Hirsh was arrested for "unauthorized" use of a computer.

References

External links
 Jesse Hirsh's personal web site
 Jesse Hirsh's commercial web site

Canadian radio personalities
Canadian television hosts
Canadian women television hosts
University of Toronto alumni
Year of birth missing (living people)
Living people